Sivuyile Ngesi (born 18 October 1985) is a South African actor, comedian, presenter, and producer.

Early life
Ngesi was born to a Xhosa family of four children in Gugulethu in the east of Cape Town. He spent his early childhood there before moving to Langa and later Pinelands. His mother Jacqueline is a school principal. He lost his father to a car accident in 2004. Ngesi attended Pinelands High School and trained at the Waterfront Theatre School and Jazzart Dance Theatre. He explained during the #FeesMustFall movement that he was unable to afford university.

Career
Ngesi began his career as a child actor, playing Gavroche in Les Misérables on tour in Asia. He also performed a piece from the musical for Nelson Mandela.

Ngesi made his television debut in the Disney Channel Original Movie Zenon: Z3 as Bobby and his feature film debut in The World Unseen. He guest starred as Thomas in 24: Redemption, a 2008 television film sequel to the Fox action series 24, and had a small role in the Nelson Mandela and Francois Pienaar biopic Invictus.

Ngesi embarked on a one-man comedy show DeKaf, which ran for three years at the National Arts Festival and won the Golden Ovation Award for Best Comedy at the 2010 festival. He then took the show on a national tour.

Ngesi starred opposite Rob van Vuuren in the 2012 crime comedy film Copposites. He, van Vuuren, and Danielle Bischoff created the children's book series Florence & Watson as well as it accompanying stage show.

In 2014, Ngesi competed alongside dance partner Marcella Solimeo in the seventh season of Strictly Come Dancing, placing fifth in the competition that year.

Ngesi has hosted the magazine show The Man Cave since 2015, winning one out two nominations for Best TV Presenter at the South African Film and Television Awards (SAFTAs). In 2016, he began hosting and producing the reality cooking competition show Jou Ma se Chef. He had a recurring role as Udo in the third season of the Starz historical adventure series Black Sails.

Ngesi produced 14 shows at the 2017 National Arts Festival, taking home a Spirit of the Fringe award for his contributions to the festival that year. Among his shows that year was Siv-ilised.

In 2019, Ngesi appeared in three films: Knuckle City, which became South Africa's Academy Award submission in the Best International Feature Film category; Bhai's Cafe, a Bollywood-style musical; and the Afrikaans romantic comedy Kaalgat Karel. The following year, Ngesi joined the cast of the Showmax drama Still Breathing as the character T-Boss.

Ngesi created and began performing under the drag persona Sivanna in 2021. The name is a portmanteau of the cider drink Savanna and the Xhosa word Siyavana. He hosted the Cape Town Drag Brunch that December.

Ngesi joined the Showmax comedy Tali's Baby Diary for its second season as well as the Netflix drama Jiva. His recurring role as Victor in Dam, also on Showmax, earned him his first acting nomination at the 2022 SAFTAs for Best Supporting Actor, having received nods for his presenting work in the past.

It was revealed in January 2022 that Ngesi had joined the cast of the upcoming Gina Prince-Bythewood-directed and Viola Davis-produced film The Woman King.

Filmography

Film

Television

Awards and nominations

References

External links
 
 Siv Ngesi at TVSA

Living people
1985 births
South African drag queens
South African male child actors
South African male comedians
South African male musical theatre actors
South African radio presenters
South African television personalities
Male actors from Cape Town
Xhosa people